Robert Steele Lewis (August 15, 1856 – May 23, 1956) was a North Dakota Republican Party politician who served as the seventh Lieutenant Governor of North Dakota under Governor John Burke.  Lewis also served in the North Dakota Senate from 1901 to 1905.

Biography
Robert S. Lewis was born in Iuka, Mississippi on August 15, 1856.

He married Alice Carpenter in 1879, and they had three children.

Lewis died in Fargo, North Dakota on May 23, 1956 at the age of 99, only few months shy of his 100th birthday, making him the oldest statewide officer in the state's history.

Notes

Lieutenant Governors of North Dakota
1856 births
1956 deaths
Republican Party North Dakota state senators
20th-century American politicians